onsemi (stylized in lowercase; legally ON Semiconductor Corporation; formerly ON Semiconductor until August 5, 2021) is an American semiconductor supplier company, based in Phoenix, Arizona and ranked #483 on the 2022 Fortune 500 based on its 2021 sales. Products include power and signal management, logic, discrete, and custom devices for automotive, communications, computing, consumer, industrial, LED lighting, medical, military/aerospace and power applications. onsemi runs a network of manufacturing facilities, sales offices and design centers in North America, Europe, and the Asia Pacific regions. Based on its 2016 revenues of $3.907 billion, onsemi ranked among the worldwide top 20 semiconductor sales leaders.

History

onsemi was founded in 1999. The company was originally a spinoff of Motorola's Semiconductor Components Group. It continues to manufacture Motorola's discrete, standard analog, and standard logic devices.

In February 2022, it was announced that BelGaN Group BV had completed the acquisition of all shares of ON Semiconductor Belgium BV from the onsemi group.

Starting March 1, 2023, onsemi's headquarters moved to the new site in Scottsdale, AZ.

Acquisitions
 In April 2000, onsemi completed the acquisition of Cherry Semiconductor.
 In 2003, onsemi acquired TESLA SEZAM (manufacturer of semiconductor chips) and TEROSIL (production of silicon) in the Czech Republic. Both of these companies were the successors of the former state-owned company TESLA.
 In May 2006, onsemi completed the acquisition of LSI Logic Gresham, Oregon Design & Manufacturing Facility.
 In January 2008, onsemi completed the acquisition of the CPU Voltage and PC Thermal Monitoring Business from Analog Devices, Inc., for $184 million.
 In March 2008, onsemi completed the acquisition of AMI Semiconductor for $915 million.
 On July 17, 2008, onsemi and Catalyst Semiconductor, Inc. announced the acquisition of Catalyst Semiconductor, Inc. by onsemi for $115 million. On October 9, 2008, Catalyst Semiconductor, Inc. announced the approval of the acquisition. On October 10, 2008, onsemi announced the completion of the acquisition.
 In November 2009, onsemi completed the acquisition of PulseCore for $17M.
 In December 2009, onsemi announced the acquisition of California Micro Devices.
 In June 2010, onsemi completed the acquisition of Sound Design Technologies, Ltd., for $22 million.
 In January 2011, onsemi completed the acquisition of SANYO Semiconductor.
 In February 2011, onsemi completed the acquisition of the CMOS Image Sensor Business Unit from Cypress Semiconductor, for $31.4 million
 In May 2014, onsemi completed the acquisition of Truesense Imaging, Inc.
 In June 2014, onsemi announced a $400 million deal to acquire California-based Aptina Imaging Corp.
 In July 2014, onsemi and Fujitsu Semiconductor announced Strategic Partnership (including foundry services agreement and the definitive agreement pursuant to which Onsemi will become a 10% shareholder of Fujitsu's 8-inch wafer fab in Aizuwakamatsu, Japan)
 In July 2015, onsemi completed the acquisition of Axsem AG.
 In November 2015, onsemi announced the acquisition of Fairchild Semiconductor.
 In August 2016, onsemi has entered into a definitive agreement with respect to the divestiture of the Ignition IGBT business to Littelfuse and has also entered into a separate definitive agreement with Littelfuse to sell its transient voltage suppression ("TVS") diode and switching thyristor product lines, for a combined $104 million in cash.
 In September 2016, onsemi completed the acquisition of Fairchild Semiconductor.
 In March 2017, onsemi announced that it would acquire and license mmWave technology for automotive radar applications developed by IBM's Haifa, Israel, research team. It included staff, equipment, research facilities and intellectual property.
 In May 2018, onsemi acquired Ireland-based company, SensL Technologies Ltd.
 In June 2019, onsemi acquired Quantenna Communications for about $1 billion. In October 2021, Bloomberg News reported that onsemi was looking to sell off Quantenna's assets.
In April 2019, onsemi to acquire GlobalFoundries 300mm Fabrication Facility in East Fishkill, New York. In February 2023, it was announced the acquisition had been completed.
In August 2021 onsemi to acquire GT Advanced Technologies.

Products

onsemi manufactures products in the following areas:
 Custom: ASICs; Custom Foundry Services; Custom ULP Memory; Custom CMOS Image Sensors; Integrated passive devices
 Discrete: Bipolar Transistors; Diodes & Rectifiers; IGBTs & FETs; Thyristors
 Power Management: AC/DC Controllers & Regulators; DC/DC Controllers, Converters, & Regulators; Drivers; Thermal Management; Voltage & Current Management
 Logic: Clock Generation; Clock & Data Distribution; Memory; Microcontrollers; Standard Logic
 Signal Management: Amplifiers & Comparators; Analog Switches; Audio/Video ASSP; Digital Potentiometers; EMI/RFI Filters; Interfaces; Optical, Image, & Touch Sensors

In 2013, the company introduced the industry's highest resolution optical image stabilization (OIS) integrated circuit (IC) for smartphone camera modules.

Operations
The company has three segments:

 Advanced Solutions Group (ASG)
 Intelligent Sensing Group (ISG)
 Power Solutions Group (PSG)

R&D
There are several Solution Engineering Centers (SEC) and Design Centers around the world.

Solution engineering centers
 United States: San Jose, California; Portland, Oregon; Detroit, Michigan; Nampa and Meridian, Idaho
 Germany: Munich
 South Korea: Seoul
 China: Shanghai, Shenzhen
 Taiwan: Taipei
 Japan: Osaka, Tokyo
 Slovakia: Piešťany

Design centers
 United States: Phoenix, Arizona; Santa Clara, California; Sunnyvale, California; Longmont, Colorado; Pocatello, Idaho; Lower Gwynedd, Pennsylvania; East Greenwich, Rhode Island; Austin, Texas; Plano, Texas; Lindon, Utah; South Portland, Maine; Bedford, New Hampshire
 Canada: Burlington, Waterloo
 Belgium: Mechelen, Oudenaarde
 Czech Republic: Brno, Rožnov pod Radhoštěm
 France: Toulouse
 Germany: Munich
 Ireland: Limerick
 Romania: Bucharest
 Slovakia: Bratislava
 Switzerland: Marin, Dübendorf
 India: Bangalore
 Israel: Haifa
 Japan: Aizu, Gifu, Gunma
 South Korea: Seoul, Bucheon
 Taiwan: Hsinchu
 Australia: Epping, New South Wales
 Russia: Saint Petersburg

Manufacturing facilities

Current
 Canada: Burlington
 United States: Mountain Top, Pennsylvania (200 mm); Gresham, Oregon (200 mm); Nampa, Idaho (200 mm, 300 mm); East Fishkill, New York (300 mm)
 Czech Republic: Rožnov pod Radhoštěm (150 mm)
 China: Leshan; Shenzhen; Suzhou
 Japan: Gunma; Aizu-Wakamatsu (200 mm)
 Malaysia: Senawang, Negeri Sembilan (2 Plants, 150 mm)
 South Korea: Bucheon (150 mm, 200 mm)
 Philippines: Carmona; Tarlac City; Cebu
 Vietnam: Thuan An, Binh Duong; Bien Hoa, Dong Nai

Sold
 United States: Pocatello, Idaho (200 mm); South Portland, Maine (200 mm)
 Belgium: Oudenaarde (150 mm)
 Japan: Niigata (125 mm, 150 mm)

Closed

 United States: Phoenix, Arizona (150 mm, sold); Rochester, New York (150 mm, sold);  East Greenwich, Rhode Island (150 mm, sold)
 Japan: Aizu (150 mm)

Awards
 In 2000, onsemi won the Forbes Advertising Excellence best in category Industrial Machinery/Electrical Components.
 onsemi won the Hot 100 Electronic products of 2009 and 2012 by EDN magazine.
 In 2012, onsemi won the IR Magazine U.S. Awards in three fields, Best IR by a CEO or chairman for mid cap; No. 56 best company in the U.S. in terms of Investor Relations; No. 3 in Best Investor Relations in technology sector for mid/small cap companies.
 In 2012 the company won the "Large Company of the Year Award" from the IEEE.
 In 2016, 2017, 2018, 2019, 2020, 2021 and 2022, onsemi was named in World’s Most Ethical Companies by Ethisphere Institute.

The company's subsidiary AMI Semiconductor (AMIS) has also won many awards, such as President's Award and Preferred Supplier from Rockwell Collins, Strategic Supplier Award from Emerson Rosemount, Inc., Outstanding Technical Support in New Product Development from Alliant Techsystems.

See also
 Freescale Semiconductor, another Motorola semiconductor spinoff
 List of semiconductor fabrication plants

References

External links
 

1999 establishments in Arizona
2000 initial public offerings
American brands
American companies established in 1999
Companies listed on the Nasdaq
Corporate spin-offs
Electronics companies established in 1999
Equipment semiconductor companies
Manufacturing companies based in Phoenix, Arizona
Multinational companies headquartered in the United States
Power-line communication Internet access
Semiconductor companies of the United States